A constitutional referendum was held in Northern Cyprus on 29 June 2014. The proposed changes were rejected by 62% of voters.

Background
On 5 June 2014 the Assembly of the Republic approved changes to 23 articles of the constitution. The proposed amendments, which would have been the first since the constitution was promulgated in 1985, were published in the state's official journal on 12 June. They included lifting the ban on civil servants joining a political party, requiring elected MPs to declare their family's wealth, children's rights, and freedom of communication.

Article 162 of the constitution required that any changes are put to a referendum. This was held alongside local elections on 29 June.

Results

References

2014
Northern Cyprus constitutional referendum
Constitutional referendum
2010s in Cypriot politics
Constitutional referendums
Northern Cyprus constitutional referendum
Northern Cyprus constitutional referendum